Daniel Zappelli is a Swiss juror, who served as Attorney General of the State and Canton of Geneva from 2002 to 2011.

Early career 
Zappelli studied law at the University of Fribourg, graduating in 1986 with the Swiss equivalent of a bachelor's degree in law. In 1989, he earned a seat at the Geneva Bar. He served as Deputy Attorney General in Geneva from 1996, and in January 2000 he became a judge at the Court of First Instance of the Geneva State Court of Justice.

Geneva Attorney General: 2002-2011 
On April 21, 2002, Zappelli was elected Attorney General of the State and Canton of Geneva for the Parti radical, defeating the candidate of the left-alliance, Jean-Bernard Schmid. He assumed the post replacing Bernard Bertossa.

On April 20, 2008, Zappelli was re-elected, defeating the socialist candidate François Paychère. Zappelli announced his resignation as Attorney General on November 7, 2011, effective March 31, 2012. In an emergency appointment, on December 1, 2011, the Grand Council of the Canton of Geneva chose Olivier Jornot to succeed Zappelli.

References 

Year of birth missing (living people)
Living people
People from Aigle District
University of Fribourg alumni
Canton of Geneva politicians
20th-century Swiss lawyers
21st-century Swiss judges
Attorneys general